A Body in the Bath House is a 2001 historical mystery crime novel by Lindsey Davis and the 13th book of the Marcus Didius Falco Mysteries series. Set in Rome and Britannia in AD 75, the novel stars Marcus Didius Falco, informer and imperial agent. The title refers to the discovery of a corpse hidden beneath the floor of one bath house and a murder which takes place in another. American editions spell "bathhouse" in the title as one word.

Plot summary

When Marcus Didius Falco discovers a corpse hidden under the floor of his new bath house, he starts to track down the men responsible - Glaucus and Cotta. He also receives a commission from the Emperor Vespasian. A building project for the British Chieftain Togidubnus is running late and over-budget. The first phase of construction had gone smoothly -  the first buildings on site were granaries, providing a supply base for the Roman army, constructed in the early part of the conquest. But progress had stalled on the stone-walled house and bath suite that would be Togidubnus's residence.  Suspecting that the men he seeks have fled to Britain, Falco accepts the mission and travels there with his wife, two baby daughters, their nurse, and his two brothers-in-law Aelianus and Justinus.

Falco arrives at Fishbourne and starts by investigating corrupt practices. However events quickly take a turn for the worse when the Chief Architect is found murdered in the bath-house of the British King. Falco takes over the project and investigates the killings.

Characters

In Rome
 Aulus Camillus Aelianus - Younger brother of Helena
 Anacrites - Chief Spy
 Camilla Hyspale - Nursemaid to Julia and Favonia
 Marcus Didius Geminus - Father of Falco, Auctioneer
 Glaucus and Cotta - Bath House Contractors
 Sosia Favonia - Daughter of Falco and Helena
 Helena Justina - Wife of Falco, and daughter of the Senator Decimus Camillus Verus
 Julia Junilla Laeitana - Daughter of Falco and Helena
 Lucius Petronius Longus - Friend of Falco and Vigiles Officer
 Maia Favonia - Falco's widowed sister
 Marcus Didius Falco - Informer and Imperial Agent.
 Perella - Dancer and Spy
 Quintus Camillus Justinus - Younger brother of Aelianus
 Vespasian - Emperor of Rome

In Britain
 Alexas - Doctor
 Blandus - Painter
 Cyprianus - Clerk of Works
 Gaius - Clerk
 Lupus - Overseas labour force supervisor
 Magnus - Surveyor
 Mandumerus - Local labour force supervisor
 Marcellinus - Retired Architect
 Milchato - Marble Mason
 Philocles - Mosaicist
 Plancus - Assistant Architect
 Pomponius - Project Manager
 Rectus - Draining Engineer
 Sextius - Mechanical statue-seller
 Strephon - Assistant Architect
 T. Claudius Togidubnus - Great King of the Britons
 Timagenes - Gardener
 Verovolcus - Briton working for Togidubnus
 Virginia - Barmaid

Major themes
 Investigation into corruption at the building of a palace of an influential Roman ally.
 The obsessive pursuit of Maia by Anacrites.
 Falco's induction of his brothers-in-law as his investigative associates

Allusions/references to history
 Set in Rome and Britannia, in AD 75, during the reign of Emperor Vespasian.
 Fishbourne Roman Palace, in the village of Fishbourne in West Sussex, is one of the most important archaeological sites in England. 
 Tiberius Claudius Cogidubnus (or Togidubnus) was a 1st-century king of the Regni in early Roman Britain.

Release details
 2001, UK, Century Hardback   
 2002, UK, Arrow, Paperback   
 UK,  Chivers/BBC AudioBooks,  read by Christian Rodska, Cassettes   CD audios  
 UK, Isis, Large Print 
 2002, US, Mysterious Press, Hardback (A Body in the Bathhouse)  
 US, Mysterious Press, Paperback (A Body in the Bathhouse)

References

External links 
lindseydavis.co.uk Author's Official Website

2001 British novels
Marcus Didius Falco novels
Novels set in Roman Britain
75
Century (imprint) books